Neghelle Airport  is a military airport located in Negele Boran, Ethiopia.

See also
List of airports in Ethiopia

References

Airports in Ethiopia
Military of Ethiopia
Military airbases